The Sweet Candy Company Building was built in 1911 at 224 South 200 West in Salt Lake City, Utah, and expanded in 1922.  Its original building, now the northern portion, was designed by Ware & Treganza in Early Commercial architecture.  The 1922 expansion doubled the size of the combined property.

It is historically significant for its association with the candy industry in Utah, and was built when the industry was automating.  It is also significant for representing the commercial work of architects Ware & Treganza who are known mostly for their governmental and residential works.

It was listed on the National Register of Historic Places in 2000.

References

1911 establishments in Utah
Buildings and structures in Salt Lake City
Buildings designated early commercial in the National Register of Historic Places
Confectionery companies of the United States
Confectionery industry
Industrial buildings and structures on the National Register of Historic Places in Utah
Industrial buildings completed in 1911
National Register of Historic Places in Salt Lake City